Sydney Townsend (born December 24, 1999 in Burlington, Ontario) is a former Canadian artistic gymnast. She represented Canada at the 2014 Summer Youth Olympics.

Competitive history 

Townsend competed at the Junior Pan American Championships in Aracaju, Brazil. She won the team gold with her Canadian compatriots. She qualified to the Youth Olympics from this result.

References 

1999 births
Canadian female artistic gymnasts
Gymnasts at the 2014 Summer Youth Olympics
Living people
Sportspeople from Burlington, Ontario
Michigan Wolverines women's gymnasts